Pharsalia andoi is a species of beetle in the family Cerambycidae. It was described by Masao Hayashi in 1975. It is known from Borneo.

References

andoi
Beetles described in 1975